The United States Green Chamber of Commerce (USGCC) is a national networking organization for businesses and community organizations that emphasize green and sustainable business practices. It asserts that sustainable business practices "spur innovation, job creation, energy efficiency and an overall brighter economic future through the triple bottom line: economic, environmental, and social sustainability."  Founded in California, it has expanded into several US states including Maryland, Missouri, Florida, Iowa, Massachusetts, and New York.   
CEO Michelle Thatcher and Board of Directors chair Jim Bunch lead the US Green Chamber of Commerce.

About
The USGCC was launched in 2011 as a nationwide expansion of the Green Chamber of San Diego County, co-founded by David Steel and Peter Zahn in 2009.  

The USGCC has created strategic alliances with like-minded groups such as  E2 (Environmental Entrepreneurs, Entrepreneurs' Organization), chambers and workforce partnerships to further its purpose of advancing best practices related to corporate sustainability and social responsibility.  	

Prominent members include Toyota, Kimpton Hotels, Northwestern Mutual, and Union Bank.

See also
 Sustainability
 Triple bottom line
 Climate change

References

External links 
 

Chambers of commerce in the United States
Business organizations based in the United States
Sustainability organizations
2011 establishments in California
Organizations established in 2011
Organizations based in San Diego